Pomorzany may refer to the following places:

Pomorzany, Masovian Voivodeship, east-central Poland
Pomorzany, Świętokrzyskie Voivodeship, south-central Poland
Pomorzany, Koszalin County, in West Pomeranian Voivodeship, north-west Poland
Pomorzany, Łobez County, in West Pomeranian Voivodeship, north-west Poland
Pomorzany, Szczecin, Poland
Pomoryany, in Zolochiv Raion, Lviv Oblast, Ukraine